Southport Pleasureland is an amusement park located in Southport, Merseyside, England. The park originally operated from 1913 to 2006 as Pleasureland Theme Park under the ownership of the Blackpool Pleasure Beach company. In 2007, the park re-opened under the ownership of Norman Wallis.

Pleasureland (1913–2006)

The first Pleasureland had operated since 1913 as a sister amusement park to Blackpool Pleasure Beach. In 2005, the park introduced an entrance fee, which proved unpopular and resulted in a serious downturn in the number of visitors. On 5 September 2006 it closed, due to a claimed lack of return on investments.

A number of rides, including the Traumatizer, were moved to the company's site at Blackpool.

The park included several historical rides such as the Cyclone wooden rollercoaster; on 14 September 2006, pictures were released onto the Internet of people dismantling the Cyclone, much to the dismay of local residents, Pleasureland fans, and coaster enthusiasts. On 18 September 2006, two protesters climbed to the top of the Cyclone in an attempt to save it. The protest lasted for three hours, after which the protesters came down over police concerns regarding the distraction they posed to passing motorists. There was a petition co-ordinated by a group of coaster enthusiasts to try and save the ride, but this effort also failed. The Cyclone was demolished on 20 November 2006.

One of the park's unique features was its Funhouse with traditional funhouse attractions such as the Wheel and the Social Mixer. The Funhouse continued to operate independently for several months until its closure on 31 March 2007. Soon after, the funhouse was gutted and parts taken to Blackpool; speculation exists that these will form party of a future heritage fairground museum in Blackpool.

Not much is known about the fate of many of the classic rides at Pleasureland, although some have been bought and put into storage for a prospective Dreamland revival project in Margate.

Southport Pleasureland (2007–present)
On 31 May 2007, it was announced that Dreamstorm International were to invest £100 million at the Pleasureland site. Pleasureland was re-opened to the public on 21 July 2007 and renamed New Pleasureland. In June 2007, some of the original Pleasureland buildings were demolished, except for buildings around the perimeter. The site re-opened under new management as scheduled, with a temporary travelling fairground. Then, following a successful summer season, the park was kept open (weekends only) until November 2007, when some demolition of remaining unwanted buildings was carried out and refurbishment of other buildings completed. A Pinfari "Zyklon Loop" rollercoaster was constructed on the site where the Traumatizer once stood and was opened at the start of the 2008 season, named 'Storm'. The Traumatizer was moved to Blackpool Pleasure Beach and opened as the Infusion in 2007.

2008
The Park reopened in 2008 on 21 March. However, on 20 March, Sefton Council announced that a company called Urban Splash had been chosen to develop Southport seafront including the Pleasureland site. Here is a report from BBC News. It was announced in October 2008 that New Pleasureland would return for the 2009/2010 seasons. An official opening schedule has been announced for 2009,

The Traumatizer station building has been demolished. In February 2008, the site of the Cyclone Rollercoaster was landscaped, and part of the old River Caves ride demolished to make room for more rides.

"Norman Returns The Pleasure" The Park re-opened for the 2008 season on 15 March and rides added for the summer months. Work has also continued on the grounds to make them look more presentable. A Big Top Circus was added during the summer weeks but was removed by its owners after only 2 weeks in the park due to the low number of people visiting New Pleasureland at the start of the summer holiday period. In Summer 2008, a new static ride was opened in the form of a swinging pirate ship. In early 2008, a new roller coaster opened. "Indy's Lost World - The Ride" is a themed indoor roller coaster, based on the latest Indiana Jones' film; Indiana Jones and the Kingdom of the Crystal Skull The roller coaster is situated inside the old Fun House building. In September 2008, it was announced that New Pleasureland will return for the 2009/2010 season. In October 2008, the park's Pinfari Roller Coaster, Storm was removed from the park and sold.

2009
On the evening of 21 April, an arson attack took place, destroying the Lost Dinosaurs of the Sahara (River Caves) and a nearby inflatable attraction. In May 2009, the original Pleasureland Wildcat coaster was bought by Norman Wallis and rebuilt in its original location. The Wildcat opened on 12 August 2009.

2010
The 'Haunted Inn', the only remaining original feature of Pleasureland, was destroyed in a fire on 30 January 2010. The Pleasureland main entrance building, which was built not long before the original park closed in 2006, was also demolished in February 2010. The Casablanca Entertainment complex was repainted white in June 2010 and is awaiting refurbishment.

Indy's Lost World Indoor Roller Coaster was closed early 2010. It is to be replaced with a new Indoor Ghost Train. The ride opened in July 2010.

Battlefield Live Southport has opened on the site of the old Southport Zoo, which is immediately adjacent to Pleasureland. Battlefield Live is an outdoor combat game using guns that fire infra-red beams. The site is accessed via Pleasureland and it opened in August 2010.

2011
The park opened during the Easter Holidays hosting a Monster Truck weekend. A circus was also moved onto the site for the spring season. The previous weekend hosted an Urban Graffiti Art Festival.

2012
The park opened in March, with a new ride called "Air" and a new log flume ride was constructed on the site of the old log flume which was demolished in 2007. A new 'Events Arena' was opened in July with plans to be used as a concert venue.

2013
The park re-opened in March, with 3 new rides from Camelot Theme Park which closed in 2012.

2014
The park underwent a further rebrand for the 2014 season, with a new website, new logo, new name and new slogan - 'Where memories are made!'. The park also introduced a new electronic token system for its rides, known as the 'Fun Card'. Guests are required to purchase tokens from kiosks and are given a Fun Card with a lanyard to wear. The card can be swiped at any park ride, eliminating the need for paper tokens. Individual tokens cost £1 and all rides have a value from 1 to 4 tokens each. Stations have been allocated around the park to show guests how many tokens remain on their card to use.

2015 
The park opened on 28 March with The Crazy Mouse roller coaster amid many other minor additions.

2016 
In October 2015, The Crazy Mouse was dismantled to make way for a new yellow looping roller coaster. Construction for the ride was completed in 2016 with the ride's name being "Speed Loop".

2017
In 2017 a few changes were made.

2018
In 2018 A Ferris wheel was added but taken away later that year. Another ferris wheel got taken down too which was ‘the kingdom in the sky’ which was moved from Camelot to Pleasureland in 2013.

2019
In 2020 a go kart track next door to pleasureland closed down and sold the land to pleasureland. The fair ground demolished the race track and built a new roller coaster called crash test, a ghost train and the grand canyon was moved here as well as another few rides meant for small children (which were removed donn later. Also the magic card system was removed as well as  the entrance fee which was good for most people snd attracted more guests.

2020
No updates were made to the park due to the COVID-19 virus.

2021
A new coaster known as 'The Rocket' was added. This coaster was built in 2001 and has lived in a few parks before being added to Pleasureland.

2022
A new mini golf course with a Viking theme was built by Pleasureland in the site of the former car park.

The future
Pleasureland has announced plans to expand and alter existing areas of the park. It will be divided into different themed lands. These lands will be a racing themed land, a pirate themed land, a viking themed land, a beach themed land and a dinosaur themed land. The majority of rides currently at the park will get removed such as the ghost train and the majority of travelling fair ground rides. Rides such as the frisbee will remain but will have different decorations. The same will happen to ‘The log flume’ which will be turned into ‘Loki’s log flume’ to fit the viking theme. Also the coaster known as ‘Happy caterpillar’ will be turned into the dragon coaster and the caterpillar will be replaced with a dragon and the decorations will change. The building once home to The funhouse and Indie’s adventure and is now housing the ghost train will soon be home to ultimate expedition. The front of the building (which has stayed the same since the funhouse) will be replaced with a new design fitting the new theme. Planning permission has also been granted for a new rollercoaster at the back of the park, near the seafront.

Current rides

Roller coasters

Thrill rides

Other rides

Notable Past Rides

Incidents
In 2000, body of murder victim Lindsey Wilson was found at the Pleasureland. She had been decapitated and dismembered by her husband Mitchell Quy, and had her body parts hidden near a roller coaster.

While under the ownership of the Thompson family, two incidents occurred on the Sky-Ride attraction: In April 2004, four people were stranded on the ride due to an electrical fault, while in August 2004, a 59-year-old employee was killed after he became trapped while performing maintenance on the ride. In 2007 the park was fined £95,000 for breaching health and safety laws and was also ordered to pay £50,000 in costs.

In popular culture
The park was a key location in Helen Blakeman's 2003 television film Pleasureland, shown as part of Channel 4's Adult at 14 season.

References

External links 
 
 New outdoor attraction at Pleasureland
 Urban Splash Will Develop Pleasureland Site A BBC News Report
  (from Wayback Machine)
 Going, Going, Gone: The Original Southport Pleasureland On themagiceye at Joyland.

Amusement parks in England
Tourist attractions in Southport
Buildings and structures in Southport
1912 establishments in England